Zbigniew Radziwonowicz (8 December 1930 – 11 December 2002) was a Polish athlete. He competed in the men's javelin throw at the 1952 Summer Olympics and the 1960 Summer Olympics.

References

1930 births
2002 deaths
Athletes (track and field) at the 1952 Summer Olympics
Athletes (track and field) at the 1960 Summer Olympics
Polish male javelin throwers
Olympic athletes of Poland
People from Shchuchyn District
People from Nowogródek Voivodeship (1919–1939)
Burials at Powązki Military Cemetery